Anton Kapotov (born June 30, 1991) is a Russian professional ice hockey player. He is currently playing with Metallurg Novokuznetsk of the Kontinental Hockey League (KHL).

Kapotov made his Kontinental Hockey League debut playing with Metallurg Novokuznetsk during the 2009–10 KHL season.

References

External links

1991 births
Living people
Metallurg Novokuznetsk players
Yermak Angarsk players
Zauralie Kurgan players
Toros Neftekamsk players
Dizel Penza players
Sokol Krasnoyarsk players
HC Lada Togliatti players
Russian ice hockey defencemen
People from Novokuznetsk
Sportspeople from Kemerovo Oblast